Mark Blake is a British music journalist and author. His work has been published since 1989 in  The Times and The Daily Telegraph, and the music magazines Q, Mojo, Classic Rock, Music Week and Prog.

Career
Blake is the author of Magnifico! The A–Z Of Queen, published by Nine Eight Books in November 2021, and Bring It On Home: Peter Grant, The Story Of Rock's Greatest Manager published by Little Brown/Da Capo in the UK and US in 2018, and voted a Music Book Of The Year in The Sunday Times, The Times, Daily Mail and The Daily Telegraph.

His previous books include the best-selling 2007 music biography, Pigs Might Fly: The Inside Story of Pink Floyd, published by Aurum Press (available under the title Comfortably Numb: The Inside Story of Pink Floyd in the United States); Stone Me: The Wit & Wisdom Of Keith Richards, (Aurum Press, 2008); Is This The Real Life: The Untold Story of Queen  (Aurum Press, 2010), Pretend You're in a War: The Who and The Sixties, published by Aurum Press in September 2014,

Blake is a former Assistant Editor of  Q, and previously edited the books Dylan: Visions, Portraits and Back Pages and Punk: The Whole Story" (Dorling Kindersley, 2004 & 2005). He has also contributed to official projects for Pink Floyd, including Pink Floyd: Their Mortal Remains, The Who, Queen and the Jimi Hendrix estate. He is represented by Matthew Hamilton at The Hamilton Agency.

Bibliography

Books

Articles

Album reviews

Book reviews

References

External links
Official site

British writers
Year of birth missing (living people)
Living people
Mojo (magazine) people